Revenge Quest (aka Amtrak From Mars) is a 1995 direct to video action/science fiction thriller directed by Alan DeHerrera, with an ensemble cast featuring Brian Gluhak, Christopher Michael Egger, and Jennifer Aguilar. It takes place in 2031  Los Angeles following the escape of a dangerous inmate from the fictitious Red Rock Prison on Mars. The film was released by Vista Street Entertainment.

Plot 
Prison fugitive Trent McKormick exits an Amtrak from Mars having escaped from Red Rock Prison. He is searching for Julie Meyers, the office woman who testified against him. Elsewhere, Detective Rick Castle is summoned by his boss and learns about Trent's escape. He is assigned to protect Julie Meyers and bring in Trent alive.  At the same time, a police officer enters Julie Meyers' apartment to secure the witness. Trent McKormick comes out of the shadows and kills the officer before figuring out where Julie works.

McKormick, walks into Julie's office and stabs her sexually-harassing boss in the throat with a large knife. Rick finds the dead cop in Julie's apartment and races to her office complex.  On his way to rescue her, Rick is attacked by a recently released ex-con. Rick is apparently responsible for the attacker's prison time. Rick knocks him out, dumps him in a garbage truck and races to the Julie's office.

In a stairwell shoot out Rick protects Julie from Trent. He takes her to the safe house and the two come close to having an intimate moment.  While taking a bath July flashes back to the day that Trent vowed revenge. Meanwhile, Trent follows a police officer and kills him after giving him information on Rick's location. Rick takes to the streets in his Dodge Viper to search for McKormick. Rick meets an old friend from the police force at a cafe to see if he has any information. After leaving the bar, Trent brutally murders Rick's friend at a local playhouse. Trent ambushes Rick and the two of them fight at an old junkyard during a rainstorm. Trent taunts Rick during the fight and misses several opportunities to kill him. Julie emerges from the shadows and  shoots Trent. She and Rick embrace and walk off.

Cast

 Brian Gluhak as Rick Castle
 Christopher Michael Egger as Trent McKormick 
 Jennifer Aguilar as Julie Meyers

Reviews
Matt Anderson of Terribly Awful said "The acting is bad, the writing is bad, the story is bad, the dialog is bad, just everything is bad".  Craig Rosenthal of Terribly Awful also remarked about the technical quality of the movie "In 1995, you didn't expect this low end quality."

DVD release
Revenge Quest was officially released on DVD in the late 1990s on the "Kill or Be Killed 4 Movie Pack" and the "Action Arsenal 10 Movie Pack".
It is available on Amazon Prime with improved video and audio.

Other formats
Revenge Quest was released on VHS in 1995.

Notes

External links
 
 
 Terribly Awful Revenge Quest review

American science fiction action films
Cyberpunk films
American dystopian films
1995 films
American action thriller films
American science fiction thriller films
1995 action thriller films
1995 science fiction films
1990s English-language films
1990s American films